The 2018 Bhutan National League was the seventh season of the Bhutan National League, the national football competition in Bhutan, having replaced the A-Division in 2013. Again, the Thimphu League provides the qualifiers from Thimphu, with the top three teams in that competition being awarded places in the National League alongside three regional teams.

Thimphu League
The 2018 Thimphu League (known as the 2018 Pepsi Thimphu League for sponsorship reasons) was held between 21 April to 8 July 2018.

League table

Paro Qualifying Tournament

First Leg

Second Leg

Paro won 18–2 on aggregate and qualified for national league.

National League

Teams
The six participating teams were: 
Transport United (representing Thimphu)
Thimphu City (representing Thimphu)
Thimphu (representing Thimphu)
Paro (representing Paro)
 Phuentsholing United (representing Phuentsholing)
Ugyen Academy (representing Punakha)

The season started on 18 September 2018.

Personnel and kits

League table

References

External links
Bhutan 2018, RSSSF.com

Bhutan National League seasons
Bhutan
1